Yavor Ivanov can refer toL

 Yavor Ivanov (figure skater) (born 1964), Bulgarian figure skater
 Yavor Ivanov (footballer) (born 1991), Bulgarian footballer